The Alwatan and Asnan International 2013 is the edition of the 2013's Alwatan and Asnan International, which is a tournament of the PSA World Tour event International (Prize money : 50 000 $). The event took place in South Surra in Kuwait from 19 December to 22 December. Simon Rösner won his first Alwatan and Asnan International trophy, beating Borja Golán in the final.

Prize money and ranking points
For 2013, the prize purse was $50,000. The prize money and points breakdown is as follows:

Seeds

Draw and results

See also
PSA World Tour 2013
Alwatan and Asnan International

References

External links
PSA Alwatan and Asnan International 2013 website

Squash tournaments in Kuwait
Alwatan and Asnan International
Alwatan and Asnan International
International sports competitions hosted by Kuwait